The Metro Women's Athletics Association (MWAA) is a high school athletic conference comprising private all-female Catholic high schools located in the St. Louis, Missouri metro area.

Members 

 Barat Academy and Whitfield School participate in sports as independent schools, but compete against the schools of the MWAA in some sports.

References

Missouri high school athletic conferences
High school sports conferences and leagues in the United States